Camila Caram (born 22 April 1989) is a Chilean field hockey player.

Caram made her debut for the Chile women's national field hockey team in 2006, and is the team's current captain.

Caram's older sister, Daniela, also used to represent the national team.

Following the Pan American Cup, Caram was named in the 2017 Pan American Elite Team for the fourth time by the Pan American Hockey Federation.

At the 2018 South American Games in Cochabamba, Bolivia, Caram captained the team to a bronze medal, Chile's worst finish in the history of the event.

References

1989 births
Living people
Chilean female field hockey players
South American Games gold medalists for Chile
South American Games silver medalists for Chile
South American Games bronze medalists for Chile
South American Games medalists in field hockey
Competitors at the 2014 South American Games
Competitors at the 2018 South American Games
Competitors at the 2022 South American Games
Pan American Games bronze medalists for Chile
Pan American Games medalists in field hockey
Field hockey players at the 2011 Pan American Games
Field hockey players at the 2019 Pan American Games
Medalists at the 2011 Pan American Games
20th-century Chilean women
21st-century Chilean women